USS Roanoke may refer to:

 was a screw frigate commissioned in 1857, converted to carry three revolving turrets in 1863, and in periodic use until 1882
 was the civilian vessel El Dia converted to a minelayer in 1917 and returned in 1919
 was a  patrol gunboat, reclassified as a patrol frigate, then renamed Lorain in 1944 while under construction
 , a  light cruiser, was canceled on 5 October 1944, prior to the start of construction
  was a  light cruiser in service from 1949 to 1958
  was a fleet replenishment oiler from 1956 to 1957
  was a  replenishment oiler in service from 1976 to 1995

United States Navy ship names